was a Japanese football player. He played for the Japan national team.

Club career
Kasahara was born on 26 March 1918. He played for Keio University. He won the 1937 Emperor's Cup. He also played for Keio BRB, which consisted of his fellow alumni players and graduates of Keio University. He won the 1939 and 1940 Emperor's Cups at the club with Yukio Tsuda, Hirokazu Ninomiya, and Saburo Shinosaki. The 1940 Emperor's Cup was the last Emperor's Cup before the war; the Emperor's Cup was suspended during World War II, from 1941 to 1945.

National team career
On 16 June 1940, when Kasahara was a Keio University student, he debuted for Japan national team against Philippines and Japan won the match. This match was the first match since 1936 Summer Olympics and the only match in the 1940s in Japan's International A Match due to World War II.

National team statistics

References

External links
 
 Japan National Football Team Database

1918 births
Possibly living people
Waseda University alumni
Japanese footballers
Japan international footballers
Association football midfielders